Triathlon has been contested at the Southeast Asian Games three times, in 2005, 2007, 2015, 2017, 2019.

Medalists

Men

Triathlon

Duathlon

Women

Triathlon

Duathlon

See also
Table tennis at the Asian Games

References